Edwin Granai (August 16, 1931–November 17, 2014) was an American politician, businessman and minister who served as a member of the Vermont House of Representatives and the Vermont State Senate. A member of the Democratic Party, Granai was that party's nominee for Governor of Vermont in 1978, losing heavily to incumbent Republican Richard Snelling. From 1981 to 1985 he served as Chairman of the Vermont Democratic Party.

References

1931 births
2014 deaths
Vermont Democrats
20th-century American politicians
Members of the Vermont House of Representatives
Members of the Vermont General Assembly